Presidential elections were held in Chile on July 8, 1826. The National Congress of Chile voted to elect the first President of the Republic of Chile.

The election was called after the resignation of General Ramón Freire from the post of supreme director on July 7, 1826. On the nights of the seventh and eighth, the Congress decided that the supreme chief of state would carry the title of President of the Republic, and that a vice president would be elected to replace him in case of illness, etc.

On July 8, the Congress elected Admiral Manuel Blanco Encalada as president and Agustín Eyzaguirre as vice president.

Results

President

Vice President

References

Presidential elections in Chile
Chile
President
Chile
Election and referendum articles with incomplete results